Iron Eagle on the Attack (also known as Iron Eagle IV) is a 1995 direct-to-video action film directed by Sidney J. Furie. The fourth and final instalment in the Iron Eagle series, it stars Louis Gossett Jr. reprising his role once again as retired Gen. Charles "Chappy" Sinclair. Doug Masters, the protagonist of the first film, returns, but is played by Jason Cadieux instead of Jason Gedrick. The film's opening scene is an alternate take on the scenario presented in Iron Eagle II, wherein Masters survived after being shot down in Soviet airspace.

Plot
While on a routine F-16C fighter aircraft patrol in United States airspace west of Alaska, Doug Masters and his wingman test the g-forces of their fighters but stray into Soviet airspace. One of the Soviet aircraft has Doug on missile-lock, shooting him down. Doug safely ejects but is captured by Soviet soldiers.

Several years later, Doug is still haunted by his days as a prisoner. Working as a crop duster, he is recruited by old friend, retired Gen. Charles "Chappy" Sinclair as an instructor at his flight school. Chappy's school has teenagers who fly his Harvard IV trainers with no regard for safety. These teenagers in trouble with the law were taken in as a means of rehabilitating them.

During an exhibition the young misfits face off against teens from the Air Force. Wheeler cons a drug dealer out of $2,000 by handing him a bag of sugar disguised as cocaine. With her co-pilot Rudy Marlowe she tries to  fly to Mexico. Doug pursues her and has her to land on an abandoned air force base. A platoon of armed men at the base try to kill them. Doug intervenes and tells Chappy about the incident. Chappy and Maj. Gen. Brad Kettle investigate the activity at a storage bunker revealed to be holding chemical weapons.

Doug leaves the school and Chappy is given a notice by the State Patrol that his flight program is terminated immediately with his students sent back to juvenile hall. Wheeler steals a trainer, creating a diversion allowing students to hijack a bus and head back to the school. Chappy organizes the students to infiltrate the airbase and acquire enough resources to stop the convoy carrying the chemical weapons. Upon entering the airbase, Kitty Shaw and Chappy discover Operation Pandora was to use chemical weapons on hostile countries, like Cuba. They print out the data before leaving the premises and handing it to Kettle. Meanwhile, Dana Osborne and Rudy attempt to stop the convoy, but are shot down. As they attempt to escape on foot, Rudy is shot by Major Pierce, but Doug, Chappy and his team accompany Kettle to Craig Air Force Base, only to realize that Kettle is the ring-leader who captures the team.

After Kettle leaves the chamber, Kitty hacks the computer setting off fire extinguishers, giving Chappy's team time to escape. A stray shot from one of the soldiers ruptures the canister, contaminating the chamber and killing Dr. Francis Gully and everyone inside. As Kitty and Peter sneak into the cargo plane carrying the chemical weapon, Chappy sends a radio message, warning everyone of a hostile aircraft heading to Cuba. Kettle orders his fighter squadron to shoot down the trainer aircraft. The squadron of two fighters attacks the trainers, only to be confronted by Doug, who has commandeered a fighter aircraft. Doug and the students shoot down the attackers.

The students approach the cargo plane and attack it. Inside, Peter Kane opens the cargo door, causing the soldiers aboard to fall out. Kitty assumes the controls. Peter then jettisons all of the canisters into the ocean. Seeing his mission as a failure, Kettle prepares to kill Chappy when Doug suddenly attacks the airbase, giving Chappy time to escape. As police arrive at the scene, Kettle enters the contaminated chamber - his fate unknown.

Days later, Wheeler tells Doug she is heading to Mexico for a new start, but he convinces her to stay. The Iron Eagle Flight School then prepares for a new batch of students fresh out of juvenile hall.

Cast

 Louis Gossett Jr. as Brigadier General Charles "Chappy" Sinclair (Ret.)
 Jason Cadieux as Captain Doug "Thumper" Masters (Ret.)
 Al Waxman as Major General Brad Kettle
 Joanne Vannicola as Wheeler
 Chas Lawther as Colonel Birkett
 Marilyn Lightstone as Dr. Francis Gully
 Victoria Snow as Amanda Kirke
 Dean McDermott as Major Miles Pierce
 Aidan Devine as Corporal Fincher
 Jeff Pustil as Airman Cameron
 Max Piersig as Peter Kane
 Karen Gayle as Dana Osborne
 Ross Hull as Malcolm Porter
 Rachel Blanchard as Kitty Shaw
 Dominic Zamprogna as Rudy Marlowe
 Sean McCann as Wilcox
 Jason Blicker as Sergeant Osgood
 J.D. Nicholsen as Luther Penrose
 Matt Cooke as Captain McQuade
 Ron Lea as Snyder

Production
Iron Eagle on the Attack was shot at the Oshawa Airport and CFB Toronto (Downsview Airport), Ontario, Canada.The main aircraft in the film scenes in Canada are three CCF Harvard IV training aircraft owned and operated by Hannu Halminen of Roaero Ltd., Oshawa. A wide range of other aircraft were seen in the background or in hangars: Beechcraft 35-33 Debonair, Bell OH-58 Kiowa, Bell 206 JetRanger, Boeing-Stearman Model 75, Canadair CC-109 Cosmopolitan, Canadair CF-116A and CF-116D, Cessna 150, Lockheed C-130H Hercules, Percival P.66 Pembroke C.51, Piper PA-11 Cub Special and Waco Classic Aircraft YMF-5C.

Other aircraft from the Israeli Air Force shown in aerial combat footage included: General Dynamics F-16A "Netz", F-21/C-2 Kfir and McDonnell Douglas F-4 "Kurnass".

Reception
Film historian and reviewer Leonard Maltin considered the first Iron Eagle as  "... a dum-dum comic-book movie ..." His only comment about the fourth in the series was simply to list it as part of the series.

Notes

References

Citations

Bibliography

 Beck, Simon D. The Aircraft-Spotter's Film and Television Companion. Jefferson, North Carolina: McFarland & Company, 2016. .
 Maltin, Leonard.  Leonard Maltin's 2007 Movie Guide. New York: New American Library, 2006. .
 Orriss, Bruce. When Hollywood Ruled the Skies: The Post World War II Years. Hawthorne, California: Aero Associates Inc., 2018. .

External links

 
 
 
 

1995 direct-to-video films
1990s action films
American action films
American direct-to-video films
Canadian action films
American aviation films
1990s English-language films
Films about terrorism
Films directed by Sidney J. Furie
Films shot in Ontario
Films scored by Paul Zaza
Direct-to-video sequel films
Iron Eagle (film series)
Films about the United States Air Force
Canadian direct-to-video films
Canadian aviation films
1995 films
1990s American films
1990s Canadian films